Mangere Island (Moriori: Maung’ Rē) is part of the Chatham Islands archipelago, located about  east of New Zealand's South Island and has an area of .

Mangere and nearby Tapuaenuku (Little Mangere) are the eroded remains of an ancient volcano of Pliocene age.

Forested until the 1890s, the island was largely cleared for sheep grazing. Rabbits and then cats were also introduced but later died out. Farmed until 1966, the island was then purchased by the New Zealand government and gazetted as a Nature Reserve.  The last sheep were removed in 1968 and restoration of the island started in 1973 and is ongoing.  Several endemic Chatham Island bird species have since been reintroduced to the island, Chatham snipe in 1970, black robin in 1976, Chatham tomtit in 1987 and shore plover in the 1990s.

See also

 List of islands of New Zealand
 List of islands
 Desert island

References

External links 
 DOC Mangere Island case study

Islands of the Chatham Islands
Uninhabited islands of New Zealand
Island restoration